Heptylparaben (heptyl p-hydroxybenzoate) is a compound with formula C7H15(C6H4OHCOO). It is a paraben which is the heptyl ester of p-hydroxybenzoic acid.

Heptylparaben has also been found to be produced in some microorganisms including Microbulbifer.

As a food additive it has E number E209, and is used as a preservative.

References

Parabens